"Space Race" is an instrumental track by Billy Preston, released as a single in 1973 on the A&M label, taken from Preston's 1973 album Everybody Likes Some Kind of Music. "Space Race" was a gold record.

Chart performance
The single, a sequel to his 1972 hit, "Outa-Space", reached number one on the R&B chart for one week and number four on the Pop Singles chart.

Personnel 
 Billy Preston – vocals, keyboards, bass guitar, producer
 David T. Walker – guitar
 Hubert Heard, Kenneth Lupper – keyboards
 Paul Riser – string & horn arrangements
 Manuel Kellough – drums
 Tommy Vicari – engineer

Popular culture
The instrumental proved popular enough that the musical variety show American Bandstand used it as the song for its mid-broadcast break from the mid-1970s until the show completed its run in 1989. 
The song can also be heard in a party scene in the 1979 film When a Stranger Calls.

References

1973 singles
Billy Preston songs
Pop instrumentals
A&M Records singles
Songs written by Billy Preston
1970s instrumentals